Bimmer may refer to:
Bimmer (film), a 2003 movie by Pyotr Buslov

Slang
BMW manufactured vehicles

See also
 Beamer (disambiguation)
 Beemer (disambiguation)